Lohrke v. Commissioner, 48 T.C. 679 (1967), is a significant case cited for its opinion which further articulated a much-litigated phrase "ordinary and necessary" business expense in the Tax Code, 26 U.S.C.S. § 162(a).  Although it has been distinguished in nine cases, it has been followed by thirteen cases and cited in various treatises.  In Lohrke, the Tax Court determined that when the taxpayer paid for expenses that he was not actually obligated to pay, he could still deduct them as an "ordinary and necessary" business expense under 26 U.S.C.S. § 162(a) of the Tax Code.

Facts
In Lohrke, the petitioner was a licensor and inventor as well as President for Lohrke Textiles, Inc. (Textiles).  Although petitioner and Textiles are separate taxable entities, petitioner paid for the damages caused by a defective shipment of fiber for which he owned the patent which created it.  Petitioner felt that to protect his business it was both "ordinary and necessary" to reimburse the customers to save his business reputation.  The respondent argued that because petitioner was not obligated to pay, this payment did not fall under the definition of an "ordinary and necessary" business expense found in 26 U.S.C.S. § 162(a) and should consequently not be deductible.

Decision
The Court determined that the expenditure was primarily "for the furtherance or promotion of that trade or business" and thus qualified as an ordinary and necessary business expense under U.S.C.S. § 162(a) of the Tax Code.  This is significant because there is a general rule that one taxpayer cannot deduct expenses that are the obligation of another.

References 

 Donaldson, Samuel A., Federal Income Taxation of Individuals:  Cases, Problems, and Materials.  Second Edition.  West.  2007.

External links

United States taxation and revenue case law
United States Tax Court cases
1967 in United States case law